Claudia Scharmann (born 13 January 1966 in Wattenscheid, North Rhine-Westphalia, West Germany) is a retired German rhythmic gymnast.

She competed for West Germany in the rhythmic gymnastics all-around competition at the 1984 Summer Olympics in Los Angeles, tying for 11th place overall.

References

External links 
 

1966 births
Living people
German rhythmic gymnasts
Gymnasts at the 1984 Summer Olympics
Olympic gymnasts of West Germany
Sportspeople from Bochum